Allen County-Scottsville High School is located in Scottsville, Kentucky, United States. It was formed in the fall of 1974 by the consolidation of Scottsville High School and Allen County High School. It is the only high school in Allen County, Kentucky.

Athletics
Allen County-Scottsville High School is a member of the Kentucky High School Athletic Association. Their mascot is the Patriots and their school colors are Red, White and Blue.

Boys' basketball

District Championships: 1981, 1982, 1984, 1992, 1994, 1995, 2005, 2006, 2007, 2009, 2010

Regional Championships: 1981, 1996

Girls basketball

2014-2015 District Champions, Region Champions, Sweet Sixteen, Elite Eight, Final Four, and State Runner Up

References

External links
 Allen County-Scottsville High School

Education in Allen County, Kentucky
Public high schools in Kentucky
Buildings and structures in Allen County, Kentucky
Scottsville, Kentucky